Meru University of Science and Technology (or MUST) is a public university in Tigania West Constituency Meru, Kenya. It is in Meru County, 15 kilometres northeast of Meru Town, along the Meru-Makutano-Maua Highway.

Academics 
Meru University offers courses in Engineering, Science, Information Technology and Business, and has the following campuses and schools:

Schools
 School of Agriculture and Food Sciences (SAFS)
 School of Business and Economics (SBE)
 School of Computing and Informatics (SCI)
 School of Education (SEd.)
 School of Engineering and Architecture (SEA)
 School of Health Sciences (SHS)
 School of Nursing (SoN)
 School of Pure and Applied Sciences (SPAS)

Campuses 
Main Campus - 15  km from Meru Town along Meru Maua Road and opposite the Njuri Ncheke shrine. It is 5  km from Kianjai Market.  
Meru Town Campus - The offices are on the 2nd floor at Hart Towers, opposite Meru Police Station.The Meru Town campus has been closed and will cease to exist as of 31st December 2022. Currently, we are not admitting new students. The remaining students on the campus will be transferred to the main campus after the August-November 2022 semester.
Marimba Campus

Library
Reuben Marambii Library has 30,000 print materials with 80,000 items in electronic and online resources. It has a sitting capacity of 500 people. The library has an Online Public Access Catalog offering services such as searching, renewing books, making purchase suggestions, placing holds on items among others. More information about the library and services offered can be found at library.must.ac.ke. The library has developed off-campus access to e-books and e-journals to allow users to access subscribed online resources.

Administration
 Vice-Chancellor - Prof. Romanus Odhiambo Otieno (Vice-chancellor)
 Deputy Vice-Chancellor (Academics) - Prof. Simon Thuranira (ActingCapacity) 
 Deputy Vice-Chancellor (Administration, Finance and Planning) - Prof. Charity Wangui Gichuki
 Finance Officer - CPA Nephat Njeru
 Registrar (Administration and Planning) - Dr Elijah Walubuka
 Registrar (Academic Research and Students' Welfare) Dr Stephen Karanja (Acting)
 Chancellor - Dr. James Mwangi (CEO, Equity Bank LTD).
 Chairman of the Council -Prof. Bosire Monari Mwebi

References

External links
Official website
Reuben Marambii Library website

Universities in Kenya
1960s establishments in Kenya